The Notre Dame of Dadiangas University (NDDU), also known as Notre Dame, is a private Catholic basic and higher education institution run by the Marist Brothers of the Schools or FMS (Fratres Maristae a Scholis) in General Santos, South Cotabato, Philippines. It was founded by the Marist Brothers in 1953 and offers undergraduate and graduate courses as well as primary and secondary education. Furthermore, it offers a broad spectrum of academic programs through its colleges. It consists of three campuses in General Santos — the main campus along Marist Avenue, the Lagao Campus where the Notre Dame of Dadiangas University-Integrated Basic Education Department (NDDU-IBED) is located and the Espina Campus. Today, NDDU is the only private university in the city of General Santos.

Under the CHED Memorandum Order No. 48, the school was granted university status on June 26, 2006.

Affiliations
As a Marist institution, Notre Dame of Dadiangas University is affiliated with the  Marist Schools in the Philippines and linked internationally with  University of Alcalá, Spain, Universidad Marista, A.C. Mexico City, Universidad Marista, Guadalajara, Mexico, Pontifícia Universidade Católica do Paraná and Universidad Marista, De San Luis Potosí, Mexico.

The university is a member of Notre Dame Educational Association, Inc. (NDEA), a network of schools named Notre Dame in the Philippines, which is under the patronage of the Blessed Virgin Mary,

Colleges
Business College
College of Education
College of Health Sciences
College of Arts and Sciences
College of Engineering, Architecture, and Technology

Notable alumni

 Manny Pacquiao (First Year College only), boxer, politician, basketball coach
 Bo Perasol (High School Graduate), basketball coach
 Carlos Isagani Zarate (College Graduate), politician

Other Notre Dame Schools in the Philippines 
 Notre Dame University - Cotabato City (NDU)
 Notre Dame of Marbel University (NDMU)
 Notre Dame of Jolo College (NDJC)
 Notre Dame of Kidapawan College (NDKC)
 Notre Dame of Greater Manila (NDGM)
 Notre Dame of Tacurong College (NDTC)
 Notre Dame of Midsayap College (NDMC)

See also
List of Marist Brothers schools

References

External links
 

Marist Brothers schools
Catholic universities and colleges in the Philippines
Catholic elementary schools in the Philippines
Catholic secondary schools in the Philippines
Educational institutions established in 1953
Notre Dame Educational Association
1953 establishments in the Philippines
Universities and colleges in General Santos